Jamda Shahi is a village in Uttar Pradesh state of India. It is located in the Sau Ghat block of Basti district. The villages under the administration of Jamda Shahi gram panchayat include Jamda Shahi itself and Katesar.

The village is home to the Darul Uloom Alimia Muslim seminary, which has 1500 students as of 2014.

Demographics 

The religious groups in Jamda Shahi are:

References 

Villages in Basti district